This list of protected areas of Roskilde Municipality is a list of protected areas of Roskilde Municipality, Denmark. It is based on a list compiled by the Danish Society for Nature Conservation. The list comprises all localities that are under landscape protection. For heritage listed buildings, see the list of listed buildings in Roskilde Municipality.

List

See also

References

External links

Protected areas
Roskilde